, known in his youth as Senkumamaru (千熊丸) and alternatively called Tachibana Munetora (立花宗虎 or 立花統虎), was a samurai during the Azuchi–Momoyama period and an Edo-period daimyō. 

He was the eldest biological son of Takahashi Shigetane, a senior retainer of Ōtomo clan. He was adopted by Tachibana Dōsetsu, and later married his daughter Tachibana Ginchiyo, succeeding the Tachibana clan. 

In 1600, at Sekigahara campaign, he sided to 'Western army'. However, Muneshige surrendered at Siege of Yanagawa under the assumption that he could then switch sides and aid the Tokugawa-loyal forces against the Shimazu clan of Satsuma. After the battle of Sekigahara, he was deprived of the Yanagawa Domain for punishment by Tokugawa Ieyasu.

In 1637, Muneshige served in the shogunate army at the Shimabara Rebellion (1637-1638), a revolt involving mostly Japanese peasants, most of them Catholics. He was then given small territory in Tanagura.

He participated in the Siege of Osaka and later he was brought back to the former territory, Yanagawa.

Muneshige in popular culture

See People of the Sengoku period in popular culture.

Honours
Junior Third Rank (November 10, 1915; posthumous)

Notes

References
立花家十七代が語る立花宗茂と柳川
立花宗茂|戦国武将列伝
風雲戦国史-戦国武将の家紋- 立花氏
大友家人名ファイル - 立花宗茂
明史 卷320
戦国期の人々の墓(供養塔) - 立花宗茂の墓

Further reading

Genjō Sanjin. Kyūshū sengokushi: Bekki gundan. Tōkyō: Rekishi Toshosha, 1978. 
Kawamura, Tetsuo. Tachibana Muneshige. Fukuoka-shi: Nishi Nihon Shinbunsha, 1999.   
Nakano, Hitoshi. Tachibana Muneshige. Tōkyō: Yoshikawa Kōbunkan, 2001.  
Tachibana, Muneshige, and Tōun Hasegawa. Ehon hōkan. Setsuyō [Osaka]: Kankidō Shigeyuki, 1688. 

1567 births
1643 deaths
Samurai
Tachibana clan
Deified Japanese people